Arotros is a genus of moths of the family Apatelodidae, first described by William Schaus in 1892, formerly classified in Bombycidae. The genus was considered monotypic, with the Brazilian Arotros striata as sole species in the genus, but  it contains seven additional species: Arotros moseri, Arotros bidentata, Arotros tridentata, Arotros colleti, Arotros giustii, Arotros nozama, Arotros vincenti.

The wingspan of Arotros striata is approximately 45 mm. The wings are buff with brown veins and striations. The base and half of the costal margin of the forewings are dark grey, as is the head. The collar is brown, with darker margins. The thorax and abdomen are buff—the latter with numerous longitudinal dark streaks.

References

 

Apatelodidae
Moth genera